Johar Ali Khan is an Indian classical violinist. He is the son and disciple of Gohar Ali Khan of Rampur, and belongs to the Patiala Gharana of Rampur. His grandfather was Ali Baksh, the founder of Patiala Gharana.

Career
Johar Ali Khan represented India at the 60th anniversary of UNESCO in Paris, where he had composed music for melody of dialogue among Civilizations Association. He also represented India at the South Asian Association for Regional Cooperation Summit in Bangladesh. He has performed or taught, as part of Indian government programs or through private organisations, in Nepal, Bangladesh, England, Syria, Fiji, Djibouti, Addis Ababa, the Netherlands, Estonia, Spain, Germany, Switzerland, Austria, Hungary, Czech Republic, France, Belgium, Finland, Sharjah, Dubai, several African countries, and Indonesia. Johar Ali Khan has composed music for the South Pacific Games on behalf of Indian Council for Cultural Relations (ICCR), New Delhi.

Johar Ali Khan has performed for several government and non-government organizations. He was a member of the advisory committee and general assembly of the ICCR (2003–2019).
He has created his own band, Sargam, with members from traditional musical families and Gharanas. He has also performed in Taj Mahotsav (2007) and Jhansi Mahotsav (2008) and performs regularly for the musical NGO SPIC MACAY. He also performed for Sangeet Natak Academy, Sahitya Kala Parishad, All India Radio, Doordarshan, Punjab Heritage Festival, Rajasthan Sangeet Natya Academy, Rajeev Gandhi Kala Mandir (Goa), Shri Ram Bhartiya Kala Kendra, European Union Cultural Week, and National Center for Performing Arts (Mumbai).

His latest performance was in Kendriya Vidyalaya Janakpuri, New Delhi, Delhi at 3 February 2023.

Discography
 Raag Lalit by VPRO Records  
 Suns of Arqa - Cosmic Jugalbandi (1999) 
 Suns of Arqa - Cosmic Jugalbandi (2000) 
 Suns of Arqa - Suns of Arqa Meet The Gayan Uttejak Orchestra 
 Suns of Arqa - Live With Prince Far-I (1999) 
 Suns of Arqa - Solar Activity 1979-2001 
 Tribal Futures: The Way Ahead 
 Amadou & Mariam - Sou Ni Tilé (1999) 
 Faya Dub(2001) 
 The Pyramid (VCD)

Films
 Blueberry (2004) - A French movie

References

External links
 Personal website
 Article on Johar
 Article on Johar
 Article on Johar
 Contribution with NGOs
  Islamic News Online focussing Indian Muslims from The Milli Gazette Newsmakers
 INDIAN COUNCIL FOR CULTURAL RELATIONS EMPANELMENT ARTISTS

1967 births
Hindustani instrumentalists
Indian violinists
Living people
People from New Delhi
21st-century violinists
Suns of Arqa members